Dermestops is a genus of leaf beetles in the subfamily Eumolpinae. It contains only one species, Dermestops ahngeri, which is distributed in Turkmenistan.

References

Eumolpinae
Monotypic Chrysomelidae genera
Beetles of Asia
Insects of Central Asia
Taxa named by Georgiy Jacobson